This is a list of foreign ministers of Cape Verde.

1975–1981: Abílio Duarte
1981–1991: Silvino Manuel da Luz
1991–1993: Jorge Carlos Fonseca
1993–1995: Manuel Casimiro de Jesus Chantre
1995–1996: José Tomás Veiga
1996–1998: Amílcar Spencer Lopes
1998–1999: José Luís Jesus
1999–2001: Rui Alberto de Figueiredo Soares
2001–2002: Manuel Inocêncio Sousa
2002–2004: Fátima Veiga
2004–2008: Víctor Borges
2008–2011: José Brito
2011–2014: Jorge Borges
2014–2016: Jorge Tolentino
2016–present: Luís Filipe Tavares

Sources
Rulers.org – Foreign ministers A–D

Foreign
Foreign Ministers
 
1975 establishments in Cape Verde